Alexander Ritchie may refer to:

 Alexander Handyside Ritchie (1804–1870), Scottish sculptor
 Alexander Hay Ritchie (1822–1895), artist and engraver
 Alexander Ritchie (1856–1941), Scottish artist and entrepreneur from Iona